Leni Schmidt (Helene Hermine Schmidt; 28 December 1906 – 11 November 1985) was a German athlete who competed mainly in the 100 metres. She was born and died in Bremen.

She competed for Germany in the 1928 Summer Olympics held in Amsterdam, Netherlands in the 4 x 100 metres where she won the bronze medal with her team mates Rosa Kellner, Anni Holdmann and Leni Junker.

References

1906 births
1985 deaths
German female sprinters
Olympic bronze medalists for Germany
Athletes (track and field) at the 1928 Summer Olympics
Olympic athletes of Germany
Medalists at the 1928 Summer Olympics
Sportspeople from Bremen
Olympic bronze medalists in athletics (track and field)
Olympic female sprinters